Sergeyevka is a rural locality (a village) in Zhukovsky Selsoviet, Ufimsky District, Bashkortostan, Russia. The population was 490 as of 2010. There are 4 streets.

Geography 
Sergeyevka is located 29 km west of Ufa (the district's administrative centre) by road. Demsky Rayon is the nearest rural locality.

References 

Rural localities in Ufimsky District